Lartey is a surname. Notable people with the surname include:

Benjamin Dorme Lartey, Liberian cleric
Henry Herbert Lartey (born 1954), Ghanaian accountant, entrepreneur, and politician
Lawrence Lartey (born 1994), Ghanaian footballer
Mohammed Lartey (born 1986), Ghanaian-German footballer
Solomon Lartey, Ghanaian businessman